Alyaksandr Klimenka (born 28 March 1983) is a retired Belarusian footballer (forward). Since 2013 he is a youth squad coach for his last club Slavia Mozyr. He has been called up to Belarus national football team.

Honours
Gomel
 Belarusian Cup winner: 2010–11
Individual
 Belarusian Premier League top scorer: 2006

External links
 
 

1983 births
Living people
Belarusian footballers
Association football forwards
Belarus international footballers
Belarus under-21 international footballers
Belarusian expatriate footballers
Expatriate footballers in Russia
Belarusian Premier League players
FC Shakhtyor Soligorsk players
FC Baltika Kaliningrad players
FC Gomel players
FC Slavia Mozyr players
FC Vertikal Kalinkovichi players